Davy Jones (born June 1, 1964) is an American racing driver. He won the 1996 24 Hours of Le Mans alongside Alexander Wurz and Manuel Reuter.

Racing career
In 1983 he came 3rd in the British Formula Three Championship behind Ayrton Senna and Martin Brundle. He also that year tested the Brabham F1 car at Brands Hatch with Bernie Ecclestone, the then team owner, looking at Jones as the next American hope for F1 competition. In the mid-1980s Jones competed in New Zealand Formula Atlantic during the off season and twice won the New Zealand Grand Prix in 1984 and 1987. In 1986 Jones drove for the Factory BMW McLaren Team in IMSA GTP with teammate John Andretti and earned the only BMW GTP victory that season at Watkins Glen. Jones won the 1996 24 Hours of Le Mans with teammates Manuel Reuter and Alexander Wurz in a TWR-Porsche. He also placed second to Buddy Lazier in the 1996 Indianapolis 500, the first of the Indy Racing League era. He has five total starts in the race as well as 16 starts in CART from 1987 to 1996. Jones also made seven Winston Cup starts in 1995 for Jasper Motorsports with a best finish of 20th at Darlington Raceway and participated in the 1992 and 1993 editions of the International Race of Champions finishing 8th and 9th respectively. Jones won the 1990 24 Hours of Daytona driving a Jaguar XJR-12, along with Jan Lammers and Andy Wallace.

Jones was seriously injured in a practice crash for the IRL race at Walt Disney World Speedway in January 1997. This was the first race where the IRL used their brand new cars with normally aspirated engines. The accident left him with an injured neck, and led to his brief retirement from racing. Jones' withdrawal from the Team Joest squad to compete in the 1997 Le Mans 24 Hours allowed Tom Kristensen to take over the vacant seat, and win his first Le Mans enduro.

Jones has since then competed in sports cars, mainly in the Grand-Am Road Racing Rolex Sports Car Series and Continental Tire Sports Car Challenge. He currently works as a guest speaker, racing advisor, instructor and also runs a driver experience course at a country club in Texas.

Racing record

American open–wheel racing results
(key)

CART

Indy Racing League

Indianapolis 500

NASCAR
(key) (Bold – Pole position awarded by qualifying time. Italics – Pole position earned by points standings or practice time. * – Most laps led.)

Winston Cup Series

Craftsman Truck Series

Complete 24 Hours of Le Mans results

References

External links
 

Living people
1964 births
Racing drivers from Chicago
24 Hours of Le Mans drivers
24 Hours of Le Mans winning drivers
24 Hours of Daytona drivers
Indianapolis 500 drivers
IndyCar Series drivers
Champ Car drivers
Indy Lights drivers
Atlantic Championship drivers
SCCA Formula Super Vee drivers
American Le Mans Series drivers
NASCAR drivers
International Race of Champions drivers
Rolex Sports Car Series drivers
World Sportscar Championship drivers
New Zealand Formula Pacific Championship drivers
A. J. Foyt Enterprises drivers
Team Joest drivers
BMW M drivers
EuroInternational drivers
Porsche Motorsports drivers
Jaguar Racing drivers